Arnaldo Mesa Bonell (6 December 1967 – 17 December 2012) was an amateur boxer from Cuba, who won the silver medal for his native country at the 1996 Summer Olympics in Atlanta, United States. In the final of the Bantamweight (– 54 kg) division he was defeated by Hungary's István Kovács. A year earlier, at the Pan American Games in Mar del Plata, he captured the gold medal in his division. In 1986 he already won the bronze medal at the 1986 World Amateur Boxing Championships in Reno.

He died due to a heart attack two weeks after his 45th birthday on 17 December 2012.

Olympic results 
Defeated John Larbi (Sweden) 19-5
Defeated Zahir Raheem (United States) RSC 1 (2:15)
Defeated Rachid Bouaita (France) 15-8
Defeated Raimkul Malakhbekov (Russia) 14-14 (referee's decision)
Lost to István Kovács (Hungary) 7-14

References

  databaseOlympics.com
 

1967 births
2012 deaths
Bantamweight boxers
Boxers at the 1991 Pan American Games
Boxers at the 1995 Pan American Games
Boxers at the 1996 Summer Olympics
Olympic boxers of Cuba
Olympic silver medalists for Cuba
Olympic medalists in boxing
Medalists at the 1996 Summer Olympics
Cuban male boxers
AIBA World Boxing Championships medalists
Pan American Games gold medalists for Cuba
Pan American Games medalists in boxing
Medalists at the 1991 Pan American Games
People from Holguín
20th-century Cuban people